The 1932 Delaware State Hornets football team represented Delaware State University in the 1932 college football season as an independent. Delaware State had a 2–5 record. Their coach was John L. McKinley.

Schedule

Notes

References

Delaware State
Delaware State Hornets football seasons
Delaware State Hornets football